Cutbank River is a river in western Alberta, Canada. It is a major tributary of the Smoky River.

It originates in the boreal forest of the Rocky Mountains foothills, on the south-eastern flanks of Nose Mountain, and flows east into the Smoky River. Before emptying in the Smoky, it is crossed by Bighorn Highway.

The river is known for northern pike, walleye and bull trout fishing.

See also
List of rivers of Alberta

References

Rivers of Alberta
Rivers of British Columbia